Great Britain, represented by the British Olympic Association (BOA), competed at the 1996 Summer Olympics in Atlanta, United States. British athletes have competed in every single Summer Olympic Games. 300 competitors, 184 men and 116 women, took part in 175 events in 22 sports. The Atlanta games saw Great Britain's worst performance at a Summer Olympics since 1952, finishing in 36th position - below nations such as Belgium, Algeria and Kazakhstan - winning a single gold medal, and 15 medals overall.

The "rock bottom" British performance at the Atlanta Olympics led to a period of soul searching about the state of British sport, which the following year led to the creation of UK Sport, a public body which distributes National Lottery funding for elite sports, Previously, due to a lack of funding, cyclist Chris Boardman had acclimatised to the humidity of Atlanta by practicing in his home bathroom with the shower turned on, and divers Bob Morgan and Tony Ally sold their Olympic kits while in Atlanta in order to raise funds. Nevertheless, the single gold medal won by rowers Matthew Pinsent and Steve Redgrave ensured that Great Britain maintained its record of winning at least one gold medal at every Summer Olympics.


Medallists

Gold
Matthew Pinsent and Steve Redgrave – Rowing, Men's Coxless Pair

Silver
Ben Ainslie – Sailing, Men's Open Laser Class
Steve Backley – Athletics, Men's javelin throw
Roger Black – Athletics, Men's 400 m
Jonathan Edwards – Athletics, Men's triple jump
Paul Palmer – Swimming, Men's 400 m Freestyle
Jamie Baulch, Roger Black, Mark Richardson, Iwan Thomas, Mark Hylton (heats) and Du'aine Ladejo (heats) – Athletics, Men's 4 × 400 m Relay
John Merricks and Ian Walker – Sailing, Men's 470 Class
Neil Broad and Tim Henman – Tennis, Men's Doubles

Bronze
Chris Boardman – Cycling, Men's Road Time Trial
Denise Lewis – Athletics, Women's Heptathlon
Max Sciandri – Cycling, Men's Road Race
Graeme Smith – Swimming, Men's 1500 m Freestyle
Steve Smith – Athletics, Men's High Jump
Tim Foster, Rupert Obholzer, Greg Searle, and Jonny Searle – Rowing, Men's Coxless Four

Medals by day

Archery

Athletics

Men's 100 metres

 Linford Christie
 Heat - 10.26
 Quarter-final - 10.03
 Semi-final - 10.04
 Final - DSQ

 Ian Mackie
 Heat - 10.27
 Quarter-final - 10.25
 Semi-final - DNS

 Darren Braithwaite
 Heat - 10.29
 Quarter-final - 10.27 (→ did not advance)

Men's 200 metres

 Linford Christie
 Heat - 20.64
 Quarter-final - 20.59 (→ did not advance)

 John Regis
 Heat - 20.78
 Quarter-final - 20.56
 Semi-final - 20.58 (→ did not advance)

 Owusu Dako
 Heat - 20.83 (→ did not advance)

Men's 400 metres

 Roger Black
 Heat - 45.28
 Quarter-final - 44.72
 Semi-final - 44.69
 Final - 44.41 (→  Silver Medal)

 Iwan Thomas
 Heat - 45.22
 Quarter-final - 45.04
 Semi-final - 45.01
 Final - 44.70 (→ 5th Place)

 Du'aine Ladejo
 Heat - 46.27
 Quarter-final - 45.62 (→ did not advance)

Men's 800 metres

 Curtis Robb
 Heat - 1:45.85
 Semi-Final - 1:47.48 (→ did not advance)

 Craig Winrow
 Heat - 1:47.41
 Semi-Final - 1:48.57 (→ did not advance)

 David Maxwell Strang
 Heat 1:47.96 (→ did not advance)

Men's 1500 metres

 John Mayock
 Heat - 3:42.31
 Semi-final - 3:34.55
 Final - 3:40.18 (→ 11th Place)

 Kevin McKay
 Heat - 3:38.02
 Semi-final - 3:43.61 (→ did not advance)

 Anthony Whiteman
 Heat - 3:40.74
 Semi-final - 3:36.11 (→ did not advance)

Men's 5,000 metres 
 John Nuttall
Qualification – 13:52.16
Semi-final – 14:08.39 (→ did not advance)

Men's 10,000 metres

 Paul Evans 
 Qualification – 28:24.39
Final - DNF

 Jon Brown 
 Qualification – 28:19.85
Final - 27:59.72 (→ 10th place)

Men's Marathon
Richard Nerurkar – 2:13.39 (→ 5th place)
Peter Whitehead – 2:22.37 (→ 55th place)
Steve Brace – 2:23.28 (→ 60th place)

Men's 110m Hurdles

 Colin Jackson
 Heat - 13.36
 Quarter-final - 13.33
 Semi-final - 13.17
 Final - 13.19 (→ 4th Place)

 Tony Jarrett
 Heat - 13.47
 Quarter-final - DSQ

 Andy Tulloch
 Heat - 13.56
 Quarter-final - 13.68 (→ did not advance)

Men's 400m Hurdles
Jon Ridgeon
Heat – 49.31
Semi-final – 49.43 (→ did not advance)
Gary Jennings
Heat – 50.41 (→ did not advance)
Peter Crampton
Heat – 49.78 (→ did not advance)
Men's 3,000 metres Steeplechase
Keith Cullen
 Heat – 8:31.26
 Semi-finals – 8:46.74 (→ did not advance)
Justin Chaston
 Heat – 8:28.32
 Semi-finals – 8:28.50 (→ did not advance)
 Spencer Duval
 Heat – 8:46.76 (→ did not advance)

Men's 50 km Walk
Chris Maddocks – 4:18:41 (→ 34th place)

Men's 4 × 100m Relay

 Tony Jarrett, Darren Braithwaite, Darren Campbell, Owusu Dako
 Heat - DNF

Men's 4 × 400m Relay
Iwan Thomas, Jamie Baulch, Du'aine Ladejo, Mark Richardson and Roger Black
Heat – 3:01.79
Semi-final – 3:01.36
Final – 2:56.60 (→  Silver Medal)

Men's High Jump

 Steve Smith
 Qualification - 2.28
 Final - 2.35 (→  Bronze Medal)

 Dalton Grant
 Qualification - 2.26 (→ did not advance)

Men's Pole Vault

 Nick Buckfield
 Qualification - 5.40 (→ did not advance)

 Neil Winter
 Qualification - 5.40 (→ did not advance)

Men's Triple Jump

 Jonathan Edwards
 Qualification - 16.96
 Final – 17.88 (→  Silver Medal)

 Francis Agyepong
 Qualification - 16.71 (→ did not advance)

Men's Shot Put

 Shaun Pickering
 Qualification - 18.29 (→ did not advance)

Men's Discus Throw 
 Bob Weir
 Qualification – 61.64 m (→ did not advance)
 Glen Smith
 Qualification – 54.88 m (→ did not advance)
Men's Hammer Throw 
 David Smith
 Qualification – 69.32 m (→ did not advance)

Men's Javelin Throw

 Steve Backley
 Qualification - 84.14
 Final – 87.44 (→  Silver Medal)

 Mick Hill 
 Qualification - 80.48
 Final – 78.58 (→ 12th Place)

 Nick Nieland 
 Qualification - 75.74 (→ did not advance)

Men's Decathlon

 Alex Kruger 
 DNF

Women's 100 metres

 Stephi Douglas
 Heat - 11.61
 Quarter-final - 11.75 (→ did not advance)

 Marcia Richardson
 Heat - 11.42
 Quarter-final - 11.55 (→ did not advance)

 Simmone Jacobs
 Heat - 11.39
 Quarter-final - 11.47 (→ did not advance)

Women's 200 metres

 Katharine Merry
 Heat - 23.14
 Quarter-final - 23.17 (→ did not advance)

 Simmone Jacobs
 Heat - 23.36
 Quarter-final - 22.96 (→ did not advance)

Women's 400 metres

 Donna Fraser
 Heat - 52.78
 Quarter-final - 51.58 (→ did not advance)

 Phylis Smith
 Heat - 51.29
 Quarter-final - 52.16 (→ did not advance)

Women's 800 metres

 Kelly Holmes
 Heat - 1:58.80
 Semi-final - 1:58.49
 Final - 1:58.81 (→ 4th Place)

 Diane Modahl
 Heat - DNF

Women's 1500 metres

 Kelly Holmes
 Heat - 4:07.36
 Semi-final - 4:05.88
 Final - 4:07.46 (→ 11th Place)

Women's 5,000 metres

 Paula Radcliffe
 Heat - 15:23.90
 Final - 15:13.11 (→ 5th Place)

 Sonia McGeorge 
 Heat – 16:01.92 (→ did not advance)

 Alison Wyeth 
 Heat – 16:24.74 (→ did not advance)

Women's Marathon
Liz McColgan – 2:34.30 (→ 16th place)
Karen MacLeod – 2:42.08 (→ 45th place)
Suzanne Rigg – 2:52.09 (→ 58th place)

Women's 110 m Hurdles

 Angela Thorp
 Heat - 12.93
 Quarter-final - 12.99
 Semi-final - 12.80 (→ did not advance)

 Jacqui Agyepong
 Heat - 13.24 (→ did not advance)

Women's 400 m Hurdles
Sally Gunnell
 Qualification – 55.29
 Semi-finals – DNF (→ did not advance)

Women's 10km Walk
Vicky Lupton – 47:05 (→ 33rd place)

Women's 4×100 metres Relay

 Angie Thorp, Marcia Richardson, Simmone Jacobs, Katharine Merry
 Final - 43.93 (→ 8th place)

Women's 4×400 metres Relay 
 Phylis Smith, Allison Curbishley, Donna Fraser and Georgina Oladapo
 Qualification – 3:28.13 (→ did not advance)

Women's Long Jump
Denise Lewis
 Qualification – 6.33 m (→ did not advance)
Women's Triple Jump
 Ashia Hansen
 Qualification – 14.55 m
 Final – 14.49 m (→ 5th place)
 Michelle Griffith
 Qualification – 13.70 m (→ did not advance)
Women's High Jump
 Lea Haggett
Qualification – 1.90 m (→ did not advance)
 Debbie Marti
Qualification – 1.85 m (→ did not advance)

Women's Shot Put
 Judy Oakes
 Qualification – 18.56 m
 Final – 18.34 m (→ 11th place)

Women's Discus Throw 
 Jacqui McKernan
 Qualification – 58.88 m (→ did not advance)

Women's Javelin Throw
 Tessa Sanderson
Qualification – 58.86 m (→ did not advance)
 Shelley Holroyd
Qualification – 54.72 m (→ did not advance)
Women's Heptathlon 
 Denise Lewis
 Final result – 6489 points (→  Bronze Medal)

Badminton

Beach volleyball

Boxing

Canoeing

Cycling

Road competition
Men's Individual Time Trial
Chris Boardman
 Final – 1:04:36 (→  Bronze Medal)

Women's Individual Road Race
Marie Purvis
 Final – 02:37:06 (→ 11th place)

Sarah Phillips
 Final – 02:37:06 (→ 19th place)

Caroline Alexander
 Final – 02:53:47 (→ 43rd place)

Women's Individual Time Trial
Yvonne McGregor
 Final – 39:09 (→ 14th place)

Sarah Phillips
 Final – 41:16 (→ 21st place)

Track competition
Men's Team Pursuit
Chris Newton (→ 10th place)
Bryan Steel (→ 10th place)
Matt Illingworth (→ 10th place)
Rob Hayles (→ 10th place)

Mountain Bike
Men's Cross Country
 Gary Foord
 Final – 2:29:10 (→ 12th place)

 David Baker
 Final – 2:32:30 (→ 15th place)

Women's Cross Country
 Deb Murrell
 Final – 2:04.44 (→ 22nd place)

Diving

Men's 3m Springboard
Tony Ally
 Preliminary heat – 345.33
 Semi-final – 203.46 (→ did not advance, 18th place)

Bobby Morgan
 Preliminary heat – 318.69 (→ did not advance, 24th place)

Women's 10m Platform
Hayley Allen
 Preliminary heat – 251.73
 Semi-final – 158.43
 Final – 259.68 (→ 9th place)

Equestrian

Fencing

Two fencers, one man and one woman, represented Great Britain in 1996.

Men's sabre
 James Williams

Women's foil
 Fiona McIntosh

Gymnastics

Hockey

Men's team competition
Preliminary round (group B)
 Great Britain – South Korea 2–2
 Great Britain – Netherlands 2–2
 Great Britain – Malaysia 2–2
 Great Britain – South Africa 2–0
 Great Britain – Australia 0–2
Classification Matches
 5th–8th place: Great Britain – Pakistan 1–2
 7th–8th place: Great Britain – India 4–3 (→ Seventh place)

Team roster
 Simon Mason (gk)
 Julian Halls
 Jon Wyatt
 Soma Singh
 Jason Laslett (c)
 Kalbir Takher
 Jason Lee
 Phil McGuire
 John Shaw
 Russell Garcia
 Nick Thompson
 David Luckes (gk)
 Simon Hazlitt
 Chris Mayer
 Calum Giles
 Daniel Hall

Women's Team Competition
Round robin
 Great Britain – South Korea 0–5
 Great Britain – Netherlands 1–1
 Great Britain – United States 1–0
 Great Britain – Spain 2–2
 Great Britain – Australia 0–1
 Great Britain – Germany 3–2
 Great Britain – Argentina 5–0
Bronze Medal Game
 Great Britain – Netherlands 0–0 (The Netherlands wins after penalty strokes, 3–4) → Fourth place

Team roster
 Jill Atkins
 Anna Bennett
 Karen Brown
 Chris Cook
 Tina Cullen
 Mandy Davies
 Susan Fraser
 Kathryn Johnson
 Tammy Miller
 Joanne Mould
 Mandy Nicholls
 Pauline Robertson
 Hilary Rose (gk)
 Rhona Simpson
 Jane Sixsmith
 Joanne Thompson (gk)
Head coach: Sue Slocombe

Judo

Modern pentathlon

Men's Individual Competition:
Richard Phelps – 5254pts (→ 18th place)

Rowing

Men

Women

Sailing

Shooting

Swimming

Men's 50 m Freestyle
 Mark Foster
 Heat – 22.73
 B-Final – 23.01 (→ 16th place)

Men's 100 m Freestyle
 Nicholas Shackell
 Heat – 51.03 (→ did not advance, 28th place)

Men's 200 m Freestyle
 Paul Palmer
 Heat – 1:49.05
 Swim-off – 1:48.89
 Final – 1:49.39 (→ 8th place)

 Andrew Clayton
 Heat – 1:51.06
 B-Final – 1:50.59 (→ 15th place)

Men's 400 m Freestyle
 Paul Palmer
 Heat – 3:51.98
 Final – 3:49.00 (→  Silver Medal)

Men's 1500 m Freestyle
 Graeme Smith
 Heat – 15.14.81
 Final – 15:02.48 (→  Bronze Medal)

 Paul Palmer
 Heat – 15:22.65 (→ did not advance, 10th place)

Men's 100 m Backstroke
 Neil Willey
 Heat – 56.27
 B-Final – 56.07 (→ 10th place)

 Martin Harris
 Heat – 57.17 (→ did not advance, 28th place)

Men's 200 m Backstroke
 Adam Ruckwood
 Heat – 2:01.35
 B-Final – 2:02.40 (→ 13th place)

 Martin Harris
 Heat – 2:07.75 (→ did not advance, 32nd place)

Men's 100 m Breaststroke
 Richard Maden
 Heat – 1:02.78
 B-Final – 1:02.51 (→ 11th place)

Men's 200 m Breaststroke
 Nick Gillingham
 Heat – 2:14.96
 Final – 2:14.37 (→ 4th place)

Men's 100 m Butterfly
 James Hickman
 Heat – 53.73
 B-Final – 53.23 (→ 9th place)

Men's 200 m Butterfly
 James Hickman
 Heat – 1:58.16
 Final – 1:58.47 (→ 7th place)

Men's 4 × 100 m Freestyle Relay
 Nicholas Shackell, Alan Rapley, Mark Stevens, and Mike Fibbens
 Heat – 3:21.34
 Final – 3:21.52 (→ 8th place)

Men's 4 × 200 m Freestyle Relay
 Paul Palmer, Andrew Clayton, Mark Stevens, and James Salter
 Heat – 7:21.92
 Final – 7:18.74 (→ 5th place)

Men's 4 × 100 m Medley Relay
 Neil Willey, Richard Maden, James Hickman, and Nicholas Shackell
 Heat – DSQ (→ did not advance)

Women's 50 m Freestyle
 Sue Rolph
 Heat – 26.39 (→ did not advance, 23rd place)

Women's 100 m Freestyle
 Karen Pickering
 Heat – 56.40
 B-Final – 56.32 (→ 14th place)

 Sue Rolph
 Heat – 56.62
 B-Final – 56.58 (→ 16th place)

Women's 200 m Freestyle
 Karen Pickering
 Heat – 2:01.46
 B-Final – 2:02.58 (→ 13th place)

Women's 400 m Freestyle
 Sarah Hardcastle
 Heat – 4:14.50
 B-Final – 4:14.13 (→ 9th place)

Women's 800 m Freestyle
 Sarah Hardcastle
 Heat – 8:37.54
 Final – 8:41.75 (→ 8th place)

Women's 100 m Backstroke
 Helen Slatter
 Heat – 1:03.89
 B-Final – 1:03.61 (→ 13th place)

Women's 200 m Backstroke
 Joanne Deakins
 Heat – 2:15.12
 B-Final – 2:14.50 (→ 12th place)

Women's 100 m Breaststroke
 Jaime King
 Heat – 1:10.83 (→ did not advance, 17th place)

Women's 200 m Breaststroke
 Marie Hardiman
 Heat – 2:31.12
 B-Final – 2:31.39 (→ 14th place)

Women's 200 m Individual Medley
 Sue Rolph
 Heat – 2:18.81 (→ did not advance, 21st place)

Women's 400 m Individual Medley
 Sarah Hardcastle
 Heat – 4:54.64 (→ did not advance, 19th place)

Women's 4 × 100 m Freestyle Relay
 Sue Rolph, Alison Sheppard, Carrie Willmott, and Karen Pickering
 Heat – 3:48.26 (→ did not advance, 9th place)

Women's 4 × 200 m Freestyle Relay
 Claire Huddart, Victoria Horner, Janine Belton, and Karen Pickering
 Heat – 8:14.92 (→ did not advance, 10th place)

Women's 4 × 100 m Medley Relay
 Helen Slatter, Jaime King, Caroline Foot, and Karen Pickering
 Heat – 4:13.75 (→ did not advance, 13th place)

Table tennis

Tennis

Men

Women

Weightlifting

Men's Light-Heavyweight
Anthony Arthur
 Final – 147.5 + 180.0 = 327.5 (→ 12th place)

Wrestling

References

Nations at the 1996 Summer Olympics
1996 Summer Olympics
Summer Olympics